(born December 1, 1945 in Kamakura, Japan) is an actress. Her brother Nakamura Kanzaburō XVIII was an actor in kabuki, theatre, television and commercials.

Filmography

Film
By Player (2000)

Television
Akō Rōshi (1964)
Minamoto no Yoshitsune (1966)
Aoi Tokugawa Sandai (2000) – Ohatsu
Brother and Sister (2018) – Kikuko

Honours 
Medal with Purple Ribbon (2011)
Order of the Rising Sun, 4th Class, Gold Rays with Rosette (2016)

External links

JMDb profile (in Japanese)

1945 births
Living people
People from Kamakura
Actresses from Kanagawa Prefecture
Recipients of the Medal with Purple Ribbon
Recipients of the Order of the Rising Sun, 4th class